Memorial Chapel was built in memory of the 1999 NATO bombing of the Federal Republic of Yugoslavia victims from the city of Niš. The chapel was built by the City government of Niš, and it is situated on Sumatovacka Street near Niš Fortress and Banovina palace, currently seat of the University of Niš.

External links

 Niš official website

Buildings and structures in Niš
Kosovo War
Monuments and memorials in Serbia
Chapels in Serbia